Coccothrinax bermudezii is a palm which is endemic to southeastern Cuba.

Henderson and colleagues (1995) considered C. acunana to be a synonym of Coccothrinax miraguama.

References

bermudezii
Trees of Cuba
Plants described in 1939